FC Avtoagregat Kineshma was a Russian football team from Kineshma. It played professionally from 1978 to 1992. Their best result was 9th place in Zone 1 of the Soviet Second League in 1986.

Team name history
 1978–1994: FC Volzhanin Kineshma
 1995–2000: FC Torpedo Kineshma
 2001–2002: FC Avtoagregat Kineshma

External links
  Team history at KLISF

Association football clubs established in 1978
Association football clubs disestablished in 2003
Defunct football clubs in Russia
Sport in Ivanovo Oblast
1978 establishments in Russia
2003 disestablishments in Russia